Harry Davies was an English footballer who played as a forward for Chorley, Port Vale, and Bacup Borough.

Career
Davies played for local club Chorley before he joined Port Vale in June 1922. He played twelve Second Division games during the 1922–23 season and scored his only goal in the Football League in a 3–0 Christmas Day victory over South Shields at The Old Recreation Ground. He was released in the summer and headed back to Chorley. After a spell at Bacup Borough, he returned to Chorley for a third time.

Career statistics
Source:

References

Sportspeople from Chorley
English footballers
Association football forwards
Chorley F.C. players
Port Vale F.C. players
Bacup Borough F.C. players
English Football League players
Year of birth missing
Year of death missing